The men's 110 metres hurdles event at the 1985 Summer Universiade was held at the Kobe Universiade Memorial Stadium in Kobe on 2 and 3 September 1985.

Medalists

Results

Heats
Held on 2 September

Semifinals
Held on 3 September

Wind:Heat 1: +0.9 m/s, Heat 2: +0.3 m/s

Final
Held on 3 September

Wind: -0.7 m/s

References

Athletics at the 1985 Summer Universiade
1985